Island No. 2 is a mostly-submerged island in Solano County, California. Formerly swampland, it was reclaimed into productive farmland, and became the subject of lengthy legal disputes in the early 20th century. Since then, it has become again submerged, and is now part of the Napa-Sonoma Marshes Wildlife Area.

Geography 
Island No. 2 is in the Napa River, upstream of San Pablo Bay (an embayment of San Francisco Bay). As part of the Napa-Sonoma Marshes Wildlife Area (in which it is designated Napa River Unit Pond 2), the area is "regularly used by hunters, fishermen, bird watchers, photographers, and hikers".

History 
Many of the islands at the mouth of the Napa River were first discovered by Europeans in an 1823 Spanish expedition led by Francisco Castro. The land became part of the new state of California upon its 1850 statehood, at which time it was used mostly to hunt waterfowl. This land was reclaimed, and the swamps drained, at some point in the mid-to-late-1800s; Island No. 2 was contained within Survey No. 115. By the end of the 19th century, "most marshland in the [area] was diked, drained, and being used for livestock grazing and farmland". Island No. 2, along with Island No. 1, Green Island and Tubbs Island, are labeled on a 1902 USGS map of the area.

In the early 1900s, Island No. 2 (like the neighboring Island No. 1, also known as "Cross Island") was owned by L.E. Cross. Later, it came into the possession of David T. Hanbury, an "English scion" and millionaire who owned several breweries and wineries in England and California. Hanbury farmed the land, and had "men over on the Island".

On October 21, 1908, the island was deeded to David's wife Marie Eleanor Hanbury, a "former Benicia hello girl". On December 29, in what the Napa Weekly Journal described as "one of the most interesting documents ever placed on record in Napa County", a mortgage on Island No. 2 was executed by Marie "with the utmost secrecy"; David was unable to sign the document "owing to illness". At the time, the  island had an estimated value between $80,000 and $125,000 ($ and $ in ). The Weekly Journal hypothesized that the mortgage had been executed in order to pay the Hanburys’ debts in Vallejo.

Later, on the morning of January 19, 1909, the Napa County Recorder's office recorded a deed in which David Hanbury sold Island No. 2 to his brother John McKenzie Hanbury, of London, for a sum of $10 ($ in ).  This deed had been executed in San Francisco on January 8, 1908; it was, however, entered into the county record nearly a month after the transfer of the island to Marie. Around February 1909, David fractured a rib while "endeavoring to get into a bath tub at Island No. 2".

David claimed that the deed transferring the island to his brother "was either obtained from him under the influence of drugs or was a forgery", saying that "it is at least odd that, if it was made more than a year ago, it was not recorded until after the genuine deed to the property which I made to my wife". In February, he and Marie Eleanor left for England; the Napa Journal said that "while it was reported that the trip was made for the benefit of the husband's health, it was believed that the real purpose was to reach an amicable understanding with the brother in Old England".  David engaged an attorney, Hiram Johnson, to "establish the validity of [his] wife's deed to the property". On December 4, John's claims to the island were dismissed.

By 1910, divorce proceedings between David T. Hanbury and Marie Eleanor were underway; the Napa Weekly Journal said that during these proceedings "the title to the famous island passed rapidly from Hanbury to his wife, then to his brother John, the English brewer, and again to the Napa Bank, and all around the circle again". By May, they had "[settled] their marital troubles" and gone to live in Santa Cruz. On May 22, 1910, Marie Eleanor gave birth to a son, David Mackenzie Hanbury.

David T. Hanbury died in October 1910, at the White Sulphur Springs in Solano County, having gone there for treatment of his poor health. In February 1911, his estate was appraised; Island No. 2 was valued at $34,680 ($ in ). In 1914, a Stockton company leased Island No. 2 and planned "extensive cultivation of the area". In 1916, W.L. Williamson and F. Henritty were arrested on charges of disturbing the peace, after a "quarrel over a lease on Island No. 2".

By 1920, the island was again in legal dispute; David Mackenzie was at that point half owner of the island (held in trust by the Anglo-California Trust Company). William Banta, David Mackenzie's uncle and legal guardian, was sued by the British members of the family for ownership of Island No. 2 and other properties in the estate. The island was put up for public auction in June 1925. In November 1926, some interest in the property was sold from Ellen Weinstein, Estelle Meyer and others to a Z.S. Israelsky. In December 1927, another notice of guardian's sale was issued, again for Island No. 2 being sold by its owner David Mackenzie Hanbury. In February 1928, a transaction was recorded in which the Anglo-California Trust Company sold Island No. 2 to a Nat Boas; on the same day, Nat Boas also acquired Z.S. Israelsky's interest in said property.

In 1927, construction started on a bascule bridge connecting to Island No. 2 from Vallejo; a cofferdam was placed in April, and construction was "nearly finished" by September.

By 1928, there existed a Hanbury Island Gun Club on the island, at which were located a "handsome new club house with 8 bedrooms, a huge club room, kitchen, pantry, showers, lavatories and all other modern conveniences" in addition to "a keeper's cottage, outhouses, blinds, ponds, levees, etc".

While Island No. 2 had been shown as dry land surrounded by levees in 1916 USGS maps, by 1942 it is shown as having significant amounts of marsh and water in its interior. By 1949, its interior is shown as almost entirely marshlands, although the "Lachman Club" remains on its northwest side. This remains the case in 1951, but by 2012 no club is shown, and the island is shown as completely submerged. In the 1990s, Island No. 2 became part of the Napa-Sonoma Marshes Wildlife Area, managed by the California Department of Fish and Game.

References

Islands of Solano County, California
Islands of Northern California
San Pablo Bay